The 1970 European Women Basketball Championship, commonly called EuroBasket Women 1970, was the 12th regional championship held by FIBA Europe. The competition was held in the Netherlands.  won the gold medal and  the silver medal while  won the bronze.

First stage

Group A

Group B

Play-off stages

Final ranking

External links 
 FIBA Europe profile
 Todor66 profile

1970
1970 in Dutch women's sport
International women's basketball competitions hosted by the Netherlands
September 1970 sports events in Europe
Euro